Scott's Hut is a building located on the north shore of Cape Evans on Ross Island in Antarctica. It was erected in 1911 by the British Antarctic Expedition of 1910–1913 (also known as the Terra Nova Expedition) led by Robert Falcon Scott. 

In selecting a base of operations for the 1910–1913 Expedition, Scott rejected the notion of reoccupying the hut he had built by McMurdo Sound during the Discovery Expedition of 1901–1904. 
This first hut was located at Hut Point, 20 km south of Cape Evans. Two factors influenced this decision. One was that the hut was extremely cold for living quarters and the other was that Scott's ship, the Discovery, had been trapped by sea ice at Hut Point, a problem he hoped to avoid by establishing his new base farther north.

Some confusion arises because Discovery Hut can technically be referred to as Scott's hut, in that his expedition built it, and it was his base ashore during the 1901–1904 expedition, but the title Scott's Hut popularly belongs to the building erected in 1911 at Cape Evans.

Description 

Scott's Hut was prefabricated in England before being brought south by ship. Insulation was provided by seaweed sewn into a quilt, placed between double-planked inner and outer walls. The roof was a sandwich of three layers of plank and two layers of rubber ply enclosing more quilted seaweed. Lighting was provided by acetylene gas, and heating came from the kitchen and a supplementary stove using coal as fuel. 

Apsley Cherry-Garrard wrote that the hut was divided into separate areas for sleeping and working by a bulkhead made of boxes of stores.

Considerable effort was made to insulate the building, and to extract the maximum amount of heat from the flues from the stove and the heater, based on lessons learned from the Discovery Hut. Terra Nova expeditioners described the hut as being warm to the point of being uncomfortable.

A cross is erected on a hill behind Scott's Hut at Cape Evans, but this is not connected to Captain Scott, having been erected in memory of the three members of Shackleton's Ross Sea Party, who died nearby. The cross erected in memory of Captain Scott and his polar companions is to be found atop Observation Hill.

Use of Scott's Hut 
During the winter of 1911, 25 men of the Terra Nova shore party lived in the hut. From here Scott and his men set out on the ultimately fatal trek to the South Pole. Following the failure of Scott's southern party to return, several men remained behind for a further winter (1912) in order to search for the bodies the next spring. In 1913, the Terra Nova expedition over, it was left well supplied with stores in the way of food and oil, and a certain amount of coal.

The hut was reused from 1915 to 1917 by several of Shackleton's Ross Sea party after the Aurora, which was to have been the permanent winter quarters, broke adrift in May 1915, and went north with the ice, unable to return. The hut became the permanent living quarters for the ten marooned men, and thanks to the stores, they were able to sustain life in comparative comfort, supplementing these stores from Shackleton's Hut at Cape Royds. In January 1917, after Shackleton had rescued the survivors, he had the hut put in order and locked up.

Although abandoned from 1917, the hut and its contents are remarkably well preserved today due to the consistently sub-freezing conditions.

Preservation and decay at Scott's Hut 

After 1917, the hut remained untouched until 1956, when US expeditioners dug it out of the snow and ice. It was found to be in a remarkable state of preservation, and included many artifacts from both the earlier expeditions. While some artifacts were taken as souvenirs at the time (and since), this hut has remained largely as it was in 1917. 

New Zealand and the UK have undertaken responsibility at various times since the 1970s to restore (largely by removing snow and ice) both Scott's hut and Discovery Hut.

While the preservation of food in the freezing temperatures and dry climate has been noted, bacterial decay still occurs. Visitors describe the seal meat preserved at the Discovery Hut as smelling 'quite rancid', and some have expressed concerns that the fabric of these huts are being affected by fungal decay.

In 2016 there was a preservation project, by photographic and laser measurements for the entire house and the surrounding area. Then this data became a 3D model, and open for public virtual tour.

Historic site 
Both Scott's Hut and Shackleton's Hut have been included on the World Monuments Watch. Shackleton's was included in 2004 and 2006, and Scott's in 2008.

The hut has been designated an Antarctic Historic Site or Monument (HSM 16), following a proposal by New Zealand and the United Kingdom to the Antarctic Treaty Consultative Meeting.

See also 
 List of Antarctic expeditions
 List of organizations based in Antarctica
 Winter Quarters Bay
 List of Antarctic research stations
  List of Antarctic field camps

References

External links 

 Scott's hut needs repair – BBC
 Discussion on issues surrounding the future of Scott's huts
 Photographs of Scott's Hut at Cape Evans today
 The page featuring Scott's Hut in the World Monuments Fund's 2008 Watch List of the 100 Most Endangered Sites
  3D model of the hut

1911 establishments in Antarctica
Buildings and structures completed in 1911
Historic buildings and structures in Antarctica
Exploration of Antarctica
Former populated places in Antarctica
Operation Deep Freeze
Outposts of Antarctica
Outposts of the Ross Dependency
Robert Falcon Scott
Ross Island
Terra Nova expedition
History of the Ross Dependency